Calochilus caeruleus, commonly known as the wiry beard orchid, is a species of orchid native to northern Australia and New Guinea. It has a single leaf which continues to develop during flowering and up to twelve greenish flowers with reddish brown markings and a labellum with a red "beard".

Description
The lateral sepals are a similar length but narrower. The base of the labellum has purple calli and two purple plates. The column lacks the sham "eyes" of most other beard orchids. Flowering occurs from December to January but each flower only lasts one or two days.

Taxonomy and naming
Calochilus caeruleus was first formally described in 1946 by Louis Otho Williams and the description was published in Botanical Museum Leaflets from specimens collected near Tarara on the Wassi Kussa River in the west of Papua New Guinea. The specific epithet (caeruleus) is a Latin word meaning "sky blue".

Distribution and habitat
The wiry beard orchid grows in swamps, wet forests, heath and woodland in New Guinea, the Northern Territory including Melville Island and in Tropical North Queensland as far south as Cardwell.

References

caeruleus
Orchids of Australia
Orchids of New Guinea
Plants described in 1946